Alexis "Pasa" Rivera Curet (born October 29, 1982) is a Puerto Rican footballer who currently plays for the Puerto Rico Soccer League club Bayamón FC and current community relations director for Puerto Rico FC.

Career

Club
Rivera began his career with Atléticos de San Juan in his native Puerto Rico. He participated in tournaments through England, South America, Spain with San Juan, and also represented Puerto Rico in the Caribbean and Central American Games

Rivera signed with the Puerto Rico Islanders prior to their first season in the A-League in 2004, and has been a part of the team ever since. He won the 2004 Athlete of the Year award from the Puerto Rico Soccer Federation, and was part of the Islanders team which won the 2008 USL First Division regular season title and progressed to the semi finals of the CONCACAF Champions League 2008–09. He was the player with most league appearances for the Islanders. 

After the dissolution of the Islanders in 2012, Rivera continued play with local Puerto Rico teams as well as the national team, most recently earning the spot of Captain for the newly re-formed Puerto Rico Bayamon F.C., a team scheduled to commence play within the NPSL in its 2014 season and the CFU.

International
Rivera is also a full international for the Puerto Rico national football team, and played in two of Puerto Rico's qualifying games for the 2010 FIFA World Cup. He also played against Canada, Saint Kitts and Nevis and Saint Lucia in the 2014 World Cup qualifier.

Honors

Puerto Rico Islanders
USSF Division 2 Pro League Champions (1): 2010
Commissioner's Cup Winners (1): 2008
CFU Club Championship Winner (1): 2010

References

http://puertoricofc.com/

External links
 

Puerto Rican footballers
1982 births
Sportspeople from San Juan, Puerto Rico
Living people
USL First Division players
Puerto Rico Islanders players
Puerto Rico international footballers
USSF Division 2 Professional League players
North American Soccer League players
Association football defenders
Association football midfielders